Wes is a common English given name, often a diminutive for Wesley or Weston. It may refer to:

People
Wes Anderson (born 1969), American film producer, director, screenwriter and actor
Wes Barker, Canadian magician
Wes Bentley (born 1978), American actor
Wes Bergmann, contestant on MTV's The Real World and Real World/Road Rules Challenge
Wes Borland (born 1975), American rock guitarist, member of the band Black Light Burns
Wes Brisco (born 1983), American professional wrestler
Wes Brown (born 1979), English footballer
Wes Butters (born 1979), former BBC Radio 1 disk jockey
Wes Chandler (born 1956), American former National Football League player
Wes Craven (1939-2015), American film director, writer, producer and actor, mostly in the horror genre
Wes Hills (born 1995), American football player
Wes Hodges (born 1984), American baseball player
Wes Madiko (1964–2021), Cameroonian musician
Wes Malott (born 1976), American professional ten-pin bowler
Wes Martin (born 1996), American football player
Wes McCauley (born 1972), National Hockey League referee
Wes Montgomery (1923-1968), jazz guitarist
Wes Moore (born 1978), American politician, banker, and author
Wes Morgan (born 1984), Jamaican footballer
Wes Naiqama (born 1982), Australian-Fijian rugby league player
Wes Nelson (born 1998), English television personality and singer
Wes Saxton (born 1993), American football player
Wes Scantlin (born 1972), lead singer of the rock band Puddle of Mudd
Wes Sims (fighter) (born 1979), American mixed martial artist
Wes Studi (born 1947), Native American actor  
Wes Takahashi, American animator and visual effects supervisor
Wes Unseld (1946–2020), American basketball player, head coach and executive
Wes Unseld Jr., American basketball coach
Wes Welker (born 1981), American National Football League player
Wes Wise (1928-2022), American journalist and politician

Fictional characters
Wesley Crusher, in the television series Star Trek: The Next Generation
Wes, in the novel The Truth About Forever
Wes, the Red Ranger from Power Rangers Time Force
Wes Gibbins, in the television series How to Get Away with Murder
Wes, the lead character in a stage musical The View UpStairs by Max Vernon
Wes, the main character in a video-game Pokémon Colosseum by Nintendo
Wes, a playable character in a video-game Don't Starve Together by Klei Entertainment

See also
Wesley (disambiguation), given name and surname

Masculine given names
Hypocorisms
English masculine given names